A Love Stronger Than Death is a play by Latvian writer Jānis Rainis.

It was translated into Esperanto in 1933, by Ints Ĉaĉe, and then translated from Esperanto to Czech by Tomáš Pumpr.

References 

Latvian plays